The Meygal (in occitan Maigal) is a French mountain region, in the Massif Central, Haute-Loire (Auvergne-Rhône-Alpes).

Description 

It forms the core of the Velay. The highest point is the Testavoyre (1436 m, 4590 feet). The Maygal is a series of jagged peaks covered by lava flow almost 500 feet thick and 37 miles long. The river Loire traverses the region, and its flow has created gorges more than 1600 feet deep.

References 

Haute-Loire
Massif Central
Auvergne-Rhône-Alpes
Mountains of France